Mops (mastiff bats or free-tailed bats) is a genus of bats in the family Molossidae. Molecular sequence data indicates that Mops and Chaerephon are not monophyletic taxa. However, the grouping of Chaerephon and Mops was found to be monophyletic when excluding C. jobimena.

Species within this genus are:

Genus Mops - greater mastiff bats
Subgenus Xiphonycteris
Spurrell's free-tailed bat, Mops spurrelli
Dwarf free-tailed bat, Mops nanulus
Peterson's free-tailed bat, Mops petersoni
Sierra Leone free-tailed bat, Mops brachypterus
Bakari's free-tailed bat, Mops bakarii
Railer bat, Mops thersites
Subgenus Mops
Angolan free-tailed bat, Mops condylurus
White-bellied free-tailed bat, Mops niveiventer
Mongalla free-tailed bat, Mops demonstrator
Malayan free-tailed bat, Mops mops
Sulawesi free-tailed bat, Mops sarasinorum
Trevor's free-tailed bat, Mops trevori
Midas free-tailed bat, Mops midas
Niangara free-tailed bat, Mops niangarae
Medje free-tailed bat, Mops congicus
Malagasy white-bellied free-tailed bat, Mops leucostigma

References
Notes

Bibliography
 

 
Bat genera
Taxa named by René Lesson